is a Japanese former Nippon Professional Baseball infielder.

References 

1961 births
Living people
Baseball people from Kagawa Prefecture
Japanese baseball players
Komazawa University alumni
Nippon Professional Baseball infielders
Nippon Ham Fighters players
Orix BlueWave players
Japanese baseball coaches
Nippon Professional Baseball coaches